Men of the Forest — African-American Logging Family in Georgia is a 1952 documentary film about an African American family of rural loggers in the U.S. state of Georgia as they transition from hand tools to a more efficient power saw. With a runtime of 1 hour, 4 minutes (64 Minutes), the film was directed by Lawrence Glasnes (January 12, 1907 - May 13, 1988). The film was produced by the American Film Producers, Inc. and distributed by the United States Information Service.

Created during the Cold War, the film was primarily intended for a foreign audience to portray American Capitalism and an African American family's role within it in a positive light considering the rising tide of Soviet propaganda against the United States and its weaknesses.

Plot
An African-American family in Georgia works to save money for a power saw. Includes depictions of timber harvest techniques and process.

Cast
 John Griggs - Narrator
 David Mathews - Commentary
 Harry Hunter - As Self
 James Hunter - As Self
 Louis Hunter - As Self
 Mamie Hunter - As Self

Crew
 Lawrence Glesnes- Director. Credited as Lawrence A. Glesnes
 Sam Locke - Writer
 Robert Gross - Producer
 Winston Sharples - Music
 Langdon V. Senick - Cinematography 
 Robert C. Jacques - Film Editing 
 Lester Orlebeck - Sound Department. Credited as Lester J. Orlebeck. 
 Edward F. Craig	- Sound Supervisor

References

External links

1952 documentary films
Documentary films about African Americans
1952 short films
American documentary films
1952 films
1950s American films